Franz Sax (born 1895, date of death unknown) was an Austrian wrestler. He competed in the Greco-Roman light heavyweight event at the 1924 Summer Olympics.

References

External links
 

1895 births
Year of death missing
Olympic wrestlers of Austria
Wrestlers at the 1924 Summer Olympics
Austrian male sport wrestlers
Place of birth missing